George Herbert Tyson Smith (1883–1972) was an English sculptor born in Liverpool. He executed many works in the Liverpool and Merseyside area, in particular war memorials. He was the brother-in-law of fellow Liverpool sculptor Edward Carter Preston. Carter Preston designed the "Next of Kin Memorial Plaque" He was the uncle of the potter Julia Carter Preston.

Tyson Smith's father was an engraver and lithographic printer. Tyson Smith attended Liverpool College of Art where he studied plaster and stone carving and clay modeling. He was taught drawing by Augustus John at the "Art Sheds". Tyson Smith was particularly interested in the early artistic works of Egypt and Greece.

In the First World War, Tyson Smith served in the Royal Flying Corps.

Tyson Smith set up his first studio in 1919 when he returned from war service and he moved into a larger studio at Bluecoat Studios in 1925.

Works

War Memorials

Other work

Gallery of images

Membership of Societies

 Associate member of Royal Society of British Sculptors from 6 December 1927 – 1945. Became a fellow in 1945.
 Fellow of Royal Society of British Sculptors. 8 March 1945 – 1972

His grave

Tyson Smith is buried in Allerton Cemetery in Liverpool.

References

1883 births
1972 deaths
English sculptors
English male sculptors
Modern sculptors
Artists from Liverpool
20th-century British sculptors
Royal Flying Corps personnel
British Army personnel of World War I